Aïn Tebernoc is a former Catholic diocese and archaeological site in Tunisia.

History
Aïn Tebernoc has numerous Roman era ruins and is tentatively identified as the site of the ancient city of Tubernuca, a municipum of the Roman Province of Africa Proconsolare Numerous inscriptions in situ confirm the name and status of the Roman city.

Following the Reconquista of Spain, a group of Andalusian Moors settled in its ruins at the end of the 15th century.

Ancient Tubernuca was also the seat of an ancient Catholic Bishopric. It was a suffragan of Carthage, which survives today as a titular Bishopric of the Roman Catholic Church. On one bishop from antiquity is known to us, Repositus, a correspondent with Cyprian. The current bishop of the Bishopric is Rubén Gonzalez Tierrablanca of Turkey who replaced Alberto Jiménez Iniesta of Spain in 2016.

References

Roman towns and cities in Africa (Roman province)
Ancient Berber cities
Catholic titular sees in Africa